Henry W. Sorge (March 18, 1852 – March 20, 1921) was an American farmer and politician.

Born in Hanover, Germany, Sorge emigrated to the United States, in 1868, with an older brother. He settled in the town of Reedsburg, Sauk County, Wisconsin. Sorge was a farmer. He served on the Reedsburg Town Board and on the Sauk County Board of Supervisors. Sorge also served on the school board and was the board treasurer. In 1891, Sorge served in the Wisconsin State Assembly and was a Democrat. His son Albert O. Sorge also served in the Wisconsin State Assembly. Sorge died in Reedsburg, Wisconsin.

Notes

External links

1852 births
1921 deaths
German emigrants to the United States
People from Reedsburg, Wisconsin
Farmers from Wisconsin
Wisconsin city council members
County supervisors in Wisconsin
School board members in Wisconsin
Democratic Party members of the Wisconsin State Assembly